Glenn Arthur Hughes (born 23 November 1959) is a former Australian cricketer, who played first-class cricket for Tasmania and Orange Free State.

Career
Hughes' elder brother is former Australian cricket captain Kim Hughes. Hughes played from 1986 until 1992 for the Orange Free State and Tasmania. He initially moved to Tasmania from home-city of Perth after finding it difficult to break into the Western Australia cricket team, and played in South Africa between 1989 and 1991 as the South African ban was lifted. He was an accomplished right-handed batsman and "solid opener" who scored over 2000 runs in his first-class career.

Following retirement, Hughes became a broadcaster at the Bellerive Oval for ABC Grandstand and a state selector for Tasmania. He also ran his own coaching centre, the Glenn Hughes Cricket Coaching Centre.

2010 rape accusation
In late 2010 Hughes faced allegations of rape by a former lover. He pleaded not guilty to two counts of sexual penetration without consent. Following payment of a $20,000 bail notice, Hughes was released to home detention for the duration of the trial. He lost both his position as state selector for Tasmania and broadcaster for ABC Grandstand. He was subsequently found not guilty of all charges.

References

External links
 

1959 births
Living people
Australian cricketers
Tasmania cricketers
Free State cricketers
People from Goomalling, Western Australia
Cricketers from Western Australia